Veluk is a small village in Olpad taluka, Surat, Gujarat, India.

Villages in Surat district